Henry Clifton (28 May 1914 – 1998) was an English professional footballer who played as an inside forward.

References

1914 births
1998 deaths
English footballers
Association football inside forwards
West Bromwich Albion F.C. players
Annfield Plain F.C. players
Scotswood F.C. players
Chesterfield F.C. players
Newcastle United F.C. players
Grimsby Town F.C. players
Goole Town F.C. players
Ashfield United F.C. players
English Football League players
People from the Metropolitan Borough of Gateshead
Footballers from Tyne and Wear